X360 may refer to:
Xbox 360, a video game console made by Microsoft
X-One (formerly X360), a magazine published by Imagine Publishing in the UK based on the Xbox 360